The following elections occurred in the year 1802.

North America

United States
 United States House of Representatives elections in New York, 1802
 1802 and 1803 United States House of Representatives elections
 1802 and 1803 United States Senate elections
 United States Senate special election in New York, 1802

Europe

United Kingdom
 1802 United Kingdom general election

See also
 :Category:1802 elections

1802
Elections